Parellada is a Spanish white grape variety of Catalan origin specially grown in Catalonia, Spain. With Macabeu and Xarel·lo, it is one of the three traditional varieties used to make the sparkling wine Cava, which is primarily produced in Catalonia. Besides its use in Cava, it is used mostly for blending in young white wines, although some more ambitious oaked blends with Chardonnay and Sauvignon blanc are also used.

Its good acidity and freshness make these wines extremely suitable for the aperitif.

Synonyms
Parellada is also known by the following synonyms: Martorella, Montonec, Montonech, Montonega, Montoneo, Montonero, Montonet, Parellada blanc, Perelada and Perellada.

References

Spanish wine
Grape varieties of Spain
White wine grape varieties